All Saints' Catholic High School is a coeducational Roman Catholic secondary school located in Rawtenstall, Lancashire, England.

History
The school is on a large site off Haslingden Road. The main building was completed in 1959, and was called Saint Ambrose secondary modern school with upper school facilities opening in 1972. A new modern foreign language centre – The Fishwick Centre - was built as part of the development of the school as a Specialist Language College.  This provides four specialist language teaching rooms, including a computer suite.

In September 2010 a new sports hall was opened.

Previously a voluntary aided school administered by Lancashire County Council, in July 2017 All Saints' Catholic High School converted to academy status. The school is now sponsored by the Romero Catholic Academy Trust.

Feeder schools
St. Veronica's, Helmshore
St. Mary's, Haslingden
St. James-the-Less, Rawtenstall
St. Peter's, Newchurch
St. Joseph's, Stacksteads
St. Mary's, Bacup
Our Lady & St. Anselm's, Whitworth.

Notable former pupils
Marc Pugh, football player

References

External links

Schools in the Borough of Rossendale
Secondary schools in Lancashire
Catholic secondary schools in the Diocese of Salford
Academies in Lancashire